Edwardes College Peshawar is a semi-government degree college which is the oldest higher education institution in Peshawar, the capital of Khyber Pakhtunkhwa Province in the Islamic Republic of Pakistan. The college, affiliated with the University of Peshawar, has about 3,000 students in Sciences, Arts and Humanities, Business Administration, Higher National Diploma, and Computer Sciences. 

The college's undergraduate and graduate degree programs lead to the Bachelor of Arts (B.A.), Bachelor of Science (B.Sc.), 4 year BS Programme in English and Computer Science, Master of Business Administration (M.B.A.) and 5 years LLB degrees awarded through the University of Peshawar Edwardes also offers an A-Level program and the Faculty of Arts (F.A.) and Faculty of Science (F.Sc.) certificates through the Board of Intermediate and Secondary Education of Khyber Pakhtunkhwa. The Higher National Diploma (H.N.D.) BS English program in business and information technology offers the option of a third year in an institution in the U.K., U.S.A. or Australia.

Originally a co-educational college, it became a boy's only college in 1930s. Edwardes has become co-educational again since 2000 with about 200 female students and 15 women among its faculty members, with numbers of women anticipated to increase. The college has a vital community life, which includes freedom of worship for all faiths, sporting events, a debating society, drama productions, and student publications. Up to 1974 it was running up by as organisation affiliated with the Church Mission Society however following Nationalisation Reforms of 1974 it was handed over to the Board of Governors headed by NWFP Governor. A ruling of the Peshawar High Court dated 14 Nov 2019 dismissed the plea of the Principal  challenging the nationalisation of the college.

In 2019, Government of Khyber Pakhtunkhwa nationalised the college.

History

The Church Missionary Society established the Church Mission College in 1900 as an outgrowth of Edwardes High School, which had been founded in 1855 by the society as the first institution of western-style schooling in the northwest frontier region of what was British India. For many years the college was the only institution of higher education in the northwest frontier. Sir Herbert Edwardes was a British colonial administrator and commander whose name the college later adopted.

The first major college building, now known as the Old Hall, was built in 1910 in a Moghul style that was replicated in a number of the college's later buildings. Edwardes College was visited three times by the founder of the nation, Quaid-i-Azam Muhammad Ali Jinnah, by Mahatma Gandhi, and the previous Archbishop of Canterbury, Rowan Williams. In its early years Edwardes awarded degrees through the University of Punjab; since 1952 its degrees have been awarded through the University of Peshawar.

==Hostel==
Edwardes has hostel accommodation for about 200 male students.

The main hostel is composed of four halls;

1. Edmonds Hall (1st Year Students)

2. Woolmer Hall (2nd Year Students)

3. B-Block Hall (2nd Year Students)

4. Founder's Hall ( Degree Students)

Decline
The college is currently in decline as a result of a long running legal battle about its ownership, which is contested between the Provincial Government of Khyber Pakhtunkhwa and the Diocese of Peshawar. The latter argues that Edwardes College was established as a private missionary educational institution by the Church Mission Society and had its own financial resources, which were created through donations and fee; the authorities contending that all privately owned schools and colleges had been taken over by the government in 1972 and that as such the college had been funded for more than five decades by the provincial government regularly and had become an autonomous institution rather than a private one.

The legal battle has brought the institute to the verge of collapse. Multiple incidents of corruption and abuse of power have come to light, such as the appointment by the principal of family members to key posts without due process. Students have held protest demonstrations and some 200 of them have left the college. According to the provincial governor, all efforts would be made to restore the trust of parents.

== Notable alumni ==

 Mehr Chand Khanna, a lawyer, well known politician and Finance Minister of NWFP from 1937–46
 Khalilur Rehman, ex-Commander of Pakistan Navy and Bahrain Navy a, Hilal-e-Imtiaz (military), served as the Governor of Khyber-Pakhtunkhwa, appointed in 2005 
Shafaat Ali, actor, comedian, television host
Fasi Zaka, satirist, political commentator
Syed Sarwar, Software Engineer at IMSciences Peshawar
Humayun Saifullah Khan, politician
 Shahram Khan, Senior Minister Health & Information Technology Khyber Khyber Pakhtunkhwa Pakistan
 Ahmad Faraz, Urdu poet
 Wajid Ali Khan, CSP
 Ameer Haider Khan Hoti, former Chief Minister of Khyber Pakhtunkhwa
 Prithviraj Kapoor, Indian film and theatre actor/director/producer
 Dr. Khan Sahib (Dr. Abdul Jabbar Khan), first chief minister of West Pakistan
 Aftab Ahmad Sherpao, politician and former chief minister, North-West Frontier Province
 Fida Mohammad Khan, founder of the Pakistan Muslim League (N) and former governor, North-West Frontier Province
 Muhammad Suhail Zubairy, professor of physics at the Texas A&M University 
 Sardar Abdur Rab Nishtar, former governor of Punjab
 Khan Habibullah Khan, (1901–1978), Justice (retired), first Chairman of the Senate of Pakistan; former Interior Minister and Minister for Kashmir Affairs
 Salim Saifullah Khan, senator, politician
 Haji Muhammad Adeel, senator, politician
 Ghulam Ahmad Bilour, politician, member National Assembly, former Minister of Railways
 Taj Khan Kalash, Pakistani ethnic minority activist
 Abbas Khattak, former chief of Air Staff, Pakistan Air Force
 General (R) Abdul Waheed Kakar, former chief of Army Staff
 Muhammad Rustam Kayani, (known As M. R. Kayani), former chief justice of West Pakistan 1958 to 1962
 Haseeb Ahsan, former test cricketer and chief selector Pakistan Cricket Board.
 Farrukh Zaman, former test cricketer
 Musaddiq Hussain, Olympian, former international hockey player
 Kabir Khan, former test cricketer
 Yasir Hameed, international cricketer
Javed Afridi, CEO of Haier Pakistan and Peshawar Zalmi 
 General (R) Khalid Mahmud Arif, vice chief of Army Staff
 Safwat Ghayur Shaheed, A.I.G.P.
 Hakimullah, retired air chief marshal, P.A.F. 1988–1991
 Owais Ahmed Ghani, former governor of KPK and Baluchistan
 Justice (R) Nasirul Mulk, 22nd Chief Justice of Pakistan and the 7th Caretaker Prime Minister of Pakistan.

See also 
List of universities in Pakistan
Education in Pakistan
University of Peshawar

References

External links 

 Edwardes College website

Educational institutions established in 1900
Colleges in Peshawar
Universities and colleges in Peshawar
1900 establishments in India
Anglican schools in Pakistan